First100 is a leadership development consultancy which was established in London in 2004 by Niamh O'Keeffe. The company's primary focus is on helping executives in their first 100 days of a new leadership role appointment, which the company claims are important. First100 has worked with clients such as BP, Facebook and Microsoft.

References

Further reading

Consulting firms established in 2004